Gulleson is a surname. Notable people with the surname include:

Haaken Gulleson, 16th century Swedish sculptor and painter
Pam Gulleson (born 1947), American politician